Hoshko Glacier is a cirque-type glacier in the Lanterman Range of the Bowers Mountains in Victoria Land, Antarctica, draining southwest from between Bowers Peak and Mount Edixon into the lower part of Canham Glacier. This glacier was first mapped by the United States Geological Survey from surveys and U.S. Navy air photos, 1960–64, and was named by the Advisory Committee on Antarctic Names for Lieutenant John Hoshko, Jr., U.S. Navy Reserve, a public affairs officer on the staff of the Commander, U.S. Navy Support Force, Antarctica, 1966–68. The glacier lies situated on the Pennell Coast, a portion of Antarctica lying between Cape Williams and Cape Adare.

References

Glaciers of Pennell Coast